Henry Myles may refer to:

Henry Myles (American football) (1904–1978), American football player
Henry Myles (cricketer) (1911–1942), South African cricketer
Henry R. Myles (1824–??), American physician

See also
Henry Miles (1698–1763), English Dissenting minister and scientific writer